Jharkhand Rajya Gramin Bank (JRGB)  is a Regional Rural Bank (RRB_). The bank was established on 1 April 2019 with the amalgamation of the erstwhile Vananchal Gramin Bank and erstwhile Jharkhand Gramin Bank under the provisions of RRB Act 1976.
It is under the ownership of Ministry of Finance , Government of India. This bank is sponsored by State Bank of India & is jointly Owned by the Government of India, Government of Jharkhand and State Bank of India.

The shareholders of the Bank are Govt. of India (50%), State Bank of India (35%) and Govt. of Jharkhand (15%). The Bank is operating in all 24 districts of Jharkhand State with its Head Office at Ranchi (sub-capital of Jharkhand State ). The bank has eight Regional Offices functioning at Ranchi, Singhbhum, Gumla, Palamu, Hazaribagh, Giridih, Deoghar & Godda.

History
JRGB has been established on 01.04.2019 with the amalgamation of erstwhile Vananchal Gramin Bank and erstwhile Jharkhand Gramin Bank in terms of provisions of RRBs Act 1976. This bank is sponsored by State Bank of India & Owned by Govt. of India, Govt. of Jharkhand and State Bank of India . The shareholders of the Bank are Govt. of India (50%), State Bank of India (35%) and Govt. of Jharkhand (15%). The Bank is operating in all 24 districts of Jharkhand State with its Head Office at Ranchi (capital of Jharkhand State ). It has eight Regional Offices functioning at Ranchi, Singhbhum, Gumla, Palamau, Hazaribagh, Giridih,Deoghar & Godda. & no. of branches covered by these Regional Offices are as under:-

 
   
Regional Office
Headquarter
Concerned Districts
Total No. of Branches
I
Deoghar
Deoghar,  Dumka & Jamtara
70
II
Godda
Godda,  Pakur &  Sahebganj
52
III
Daltonganj
Palamau
44
IV
Garhwa
Garhwa &  Latehar
37

Overview
Date of Establishment
30 June 2006 
(With the amalgamation of erstwhile Santhal Parganas Gramin Bank and Palamau Kshetriya Gramin Bank vide Govt. of India Notification No. F.NO. 1/4/2006-RRB(III) dated 30.06.06)
Total Geographical areas covered
(i) Santhal Parganas Division вЂ" 14,129 km2
(ii) Palamau Division- 11,651 km2
(iii) Total Area-25,780 km2
 Districts covered
09 (Nine)
Santhal Parganas Division
(i) Dumka (ii) Deoghar (iii) Jamtara (iv) Godda             (v) Pakur (vi) Sahibganj 
Palamau Division 
(vii) Palamau (viii) Latehar    (ix) Garhwa
No. of Blocks covered
 87
Regional Offices
(i)     Deoghar         (Region-I)
(ii)  Godda         (Region-II)
(iii) Daltonganj   (Region-III)   
(iv) Garhwa       (Region-IV)
Business Performance
As on 31.03.12
As on 31.03.13
Deposit вЂ"      169151 lac
Advances-  67084 lac
Profit-          1621  lac
C:D Ratio-    39.66%   
N.P.A.-          9.74%
Deposit вЂ"      187979 lac
Advances-  87232 lac
Profit-          1908 lac
C:D Ratio-   46.41%   
N.P.A.-         7.34%
Number of Branches (203)
  Rural Branches (180), Semi-Urban Branches(23) &  Urban Branches(NIL)
Number of Staff(Excluding Sponsor Bank) [913]

Amalgamation
By central government notification on 31 January 2019, Jharkhand Gramin Bank and 
Vananchal Gramin Bank were amalgamated to form  
Jharkhand Rajya Gramin Bank. From 1 April 2019, all the 433 branches of merged bank are operating under new name.

See also

Indian banking
List of banks in India

References

 List of VGB Branchesin Jharkhand: https://graminbanks.com/Vananchal-Gramin-Bank/Jharkhand

External links
 

Regional rural banks of India
Banks established in 2019
Economy of Jharkhand
Indian companies established in 2019
2019 establishments in Jharkhand